Lost Empires is a 1986 television miniseries adaptation of J. B. Priestley's 1965 novel of the same name and starred Colin Firth, John Castle and Laurence Olivier. Produced by Granada Television, it was shown as a serial, and premiered on the UK's ITV network between 24 October and 5 December 1986.

Plot
After the death of his mother, Richard Herncastle (Colin Firth) is offered a job by his uncle, his mother's brother.  Nick Ollanton is a stage conjurer in variety theatre and Richard joins the act where he meets the other members of the team and the rest of the acts on the bill as they travel around Britain appearing at the Empires, the old variety theatres that have since vanished. He becomes our eyes as he experiences the last few months of peace before World War I breaks out and changes the world forever.

During the course of the seven episodes (eight hours), Firth's character, young Richard Herncastle, sees the "whole wide world" from backstage at the music hall variety shows with which the magic act travels, just as his uncle Nick (John Castle) has promised—hilarity, beauty, love, lust, fear, despair. Richard comes of age just as the world enters the fateful year of 1914—the outbreak of World War I, when the greatest of all disappearing acts becomes imminent: the disappearance of millions.

The series has the second to last appearance of Olivier as a fading comedian named Harry Burrard, who has long since lost his audience and his comic abilities. Harry should have retired years before, however he has nowhere else to go and his brain is collapsing into paranoia. The role is a sort of older version of Olivier's Archie Rice, from The Entertainer (1960).

Cast
Colin Firth as Richard Herncastle
John Castle as Nick Ollanton
Gillian Bevan as Cissie Mapes
Beatie Edney as Nancy Ellis
Laurence Olivier as Harry Burrard
Carmen du Sautoy as Julie Blane
Pamela Stephenson as Lilly Farris
Jim Carter as Inspector Crabbe

Awards
The series was nominated for six Television BAFTA Awards  including Best Costume Design, Best Make-up. In the US Olivier received an Emmy Award nomination for Outstanding Supporting Actor in a Miniseries or a Movie.

Video and DVD
The series has been released on both VHS and DVD format.

References

External links

Photograph of cast.

1986 British television series debuts
1986 British television series endings
1980s British drama television series
Period television series
ITV television dramas
1980s British television miniseries
Television series by ITV Studios
Television shows produced by Granada Television
English-language television shows
Television shows set in England